Kwon Sun-yong (born 23 June 1995) is a North Korean judoka.

She participated at the 2018 World Judo Championships, winning a medal.

References

External links

1995 births
Living people
North Korean female judoka
Judoka at the 2018 Asian Games
Asian Games competitors for North Korea
21st-century North Korean women